Chris Sheridan is the name of:

 Chris Sheridan (director), Canadian filmmaker
 Chris Sheridan (writer) (born 1967), American screenwriter, producer, and voice actor
 Chris Sheridan (sportswriter) (born 1965), sportswriter, formerly for ESPN
 Chris Sheridan (guitarist/musician), guitarist for Simplified